Auga is a commune in the Pyrénées-Atlantiques department in the Nouvelle-Aquitaine region of south-western France.

Geography
Auga is located some 20 km north of Pau and 35 km east of Orthez. Access to the commune is by the D40 road which branches off the D944 just south of Méracq and goes south through the length of the commune and the village before continuing to join the D834 near Sauvagnon in the south. The D220 road goes south from the village to Viven. The commune is mostly farmland with scattered forests.

The Pyrénées-Atlantiques Interurban Network bus line has a stop in the commune on route 842 from Malaussanne to Pau.

The Luy de France flows north up the eastern side of the commune and continues north-west to join the Luy de Béarn to form the Luy north-east of Castel-Sarrazin.

Places and hamlets

 Bidot
 Bret
 Castaing
 Cazenave
 Claux
 Grange Haget
 Haou
 Laplante
 Lauroua
 Maupas
 Méhil
 Miraut
 Moun
 Pargade
 Parrot
 Pellarouy
 Péruillet

Neighbouring communes and villages

Toponymy
The commune name in béarnais is Augar. Michel Grosclaude suggested the etymology is Gascon coming from augar meaning "marshy terrain".

The following table details the origins of the commune name and other names in the commune.

Sources:

Raymond: Topographic Dictionary of the Department of Basses-Pyrenees, 1863, on the page numbers indicated in the table. 
Grosclaude: Toponymic Dictionary of communes, Béarn, 2006 

Origins:

Saint-Pé: Cartulary of the Abbey of Saint-Pé
Fors de Béarn
Census: Census of Béarn
Homages: Homages of Béarn
Reformation: Reformation of Béarn

History
Auriol Centulle, third son of Centule IV, Viscount of Béarn, and Angèle d'Oloron, was lord of Clarac, Igon, Baudreix, Boeil, and Auga.

Paul Raymond noted on page 17 of the 1863 dictionary that the commune had two Lay Abbeys, vassals of the Viscounts of Béarn: Abadie-Susan and Abadie-Jusan. In 1385, Auga had 22 fires and depended on the bailiwick of Pau. Auga was also a ruffebaronnie, vassal of the Viscounts of Béarn.

The fief of Abescat was also a vassal of the Viscounts of Béarn.

Administration

List of Successive Mayors

Inter-communality
The commune is part of four inter-communal structures:
 the Communauté de communes des Luys en Béarn;
 the AEP association of Arzacq;
 the Energy association of Pyrénées-Atlantiques;
 the inter-communal association of Aubin-Auga-Doumy-Bournos;

Demography
In 2017 the commune had 153 inhabitants.

Culture and heritage

Civil heritage
The commune has a number of buildings and structures that are registered as historical monuments:
The Haou Blacksmith's House (19th century)
A House at Haou (19th century)
A Farmhouse at Pellarouy (17th century)
A Farmhouse at Pargade (1733)
A Farmhouse at Miraut (1830)
The Maison Lacabanne Farmhouse at Bret (17th century)
The Maison Labescat House (19th century) This was one of the two Lay Abbeys mentioned by Paul Raymond which was rebuilt in the 19th century.
A Mill at Grange Haget (1707)
The Maison Dubourdieu House (19th century)
A Farmhouse at Claux (1780)
A Farmhouse at Bidot (1801)
The Chateau d'Auga Fourcade fortified chateau (11th century)
Houses and Farms (17th-19th centuries)

Religious heritage

The Parish Church of Saint-Laurent (12th century) is registered as a historical monument.

The Church contains several items that are registered as historical objects:
The Furniture in the Church
The Furniture in the Church (Supplementary list)
A Painting: Christ on the Cross between the Virgin and Saint Laurent (18th century)
Altar, Altar seating, Tabernacle, and 2 Statues (19th century)
The Balustrade of the gallery (18th century)

Facilities

Education
Auga has no primary school as it is part of an inter-communal educational regrouping with Aubin, Bournos, and Doumy.

Sports
People from the commune play football at ESBDG (Bournos Doumy Garlède Sports Group)

See also
Communes of the Pyrénées-Atlantiques department

External links
Auga on Géoportail, National Geographic Institute (IGN) website 
Anga on the 1750 Cassini Map

References

Communes of Pyrénées-Atlantiques